
The following lists events that happened during 1835 in South Africa.

Events
 The Voortrekkers start leaving the Cape Colony in what is called the Great Trek into the interior to escape British domination
 Port Natal is renamed Durban in honor of the Cape Colony Governor, Sir Benjamin d'Urban

Deaths
 12 February  - Hintsa ka Khawuta, chief of Gcaleka of the Xhosa tribe, is shot and killed while trying to escape from capture by the British forces (some sources record the date as 12 May)

References
See Years in South Africa for list of References

 
South Africa
Years in South Africa